Ian Chan Cheuk-yin (born 9 June 1993), is a Hong Kong singer-songwriter, actor, and a member of the Cantopop group Mirror. He was a former volleyball player for the Hong Kong men's national volleyball team and South China Athletic Association. He is also the founder of the clothing brand Indipandant (stylised as iNDIPANDANT and idpt.).

Early life and education 
Chan was born on 9 June 1993 in Hong Kong. He is the youngest son and has two older brothers and one older sister. He was originally given the baptismal name Thomas, but he later chose the name Ian based on the main character of a story.

Chan graduated from St Francis of Assisi's Caritas School and Cheung Sha Wan Catholic Secondary School.

In high school, Chan's first-year homeroom teacher happened to be the coach of the volleyball team and asked him to try out. Although he did not make the cut the first year, Chan kept practicing and was successfully selected the following year. He was named "best setter" at the 2011-2012 All Hong Kong Schools Jing Ying Volleyball Tournament. Chan also took part in basketball, table tennis and track and field. He also got a black belt in Taekwondo.

He went on to study Public Policy and Politics at the City University of Hong Kong and represented his university as part of the national volleyball team through the South China Athletic Association.

Chan also developed an interest in music, learning how to play the piano and guitar on his own in his free time. In his freshman year at CityU, he participated in the CityU Student Union's 8th Joint Society Singing Contest, winning first place and getting free vocal lessons for a year. He later went on to sign with ST Entertainment, introduced to him by his vocal coach.

Career

2018–present: King Maker and MIRROR 
In 2018, Chan's entertainment company suggested that he participate in the ViuTV  competition. With his university graduation approaching and knowing it would be difficult to have a career as an athlete in Hong Kong, Chan retired from the national volleyball team in order to focus on his career as a performer and to participate in the show.

Throughout the show, Chan exhibited his musical talents, singing in Cantonese, English and Mandarin, as well as performing with a guitar and a piano. Chan finished in second place with a score of 16.3%.

During a MIRROR 100問 video, when a staff member asked what each of the group members called their personal fans, Chan responded "Hello".As a result, his fans became known as Hellosss, although Chan later remarked that he did not know when that name had become official.

2019–present: Solo activities 
On 9 June 2019, Chan debuted as a solo artist with his first single "二期大樓" (Phase II Building) and held his first solo mini concert called "Ian Chan Better Me Mini Concert". His fellow group members came out to support him in celebration of his 26th birthday.

On 2 September 2019, Chan released his second solo single "另一個諾貝爾" (Another Nobel), coinciding with the release of Keung To's "亞特蘭提斯" (Atlantis). The two also worked together for their music film , released on 6 September.

Chan was asked if there was competitive pressure releasing music at the same time as Keung, since the two were often compared, being the top two finalists of Good Night Show — King Maker. Chan responded that he and Keung instead believed that promoting together was mutually beneficial, hoping that it could get more fans to discover and listen to both their songs. In addition, he felt their styles were different and did not necessarily compete.

This bias is analogous to when a person only looks at the positive side of things without also considering the negative. Conversely, when a person loses someone or something precious, they may come to realise and to appreciate its value only after it has been lost. Chan expressed that these two possible readings can be applied to the song's central theme about relationships. He also noted that it was difficult getting the feel for the song when he first started recording, but later got a better grasp of the intended emotion after watching Battle Angel (OVA).

Chan stated it was like destiny that the first drama he got to act in was one similar to his past life as a volleyball player. His past volleyball experience also allowed him to be a body double for his fellow cast members. We are the Littles began airing on ViuTV in November 2020.

On 14 February 2020, Chan released "正式開始" (Officially Begin) as a Valentine's Day present for fans. In the music video, Chan brings the fans on a trip in Japan, as if filmed from first-person perspective. Chan noted that the hand in the music video was not his manager Wong but another crew member.

On 29 July 2020, Chan released "鯨落" (Whale Fall), his first song where he is credited for both the music and the lyrics. Chan drew inspiration from an article he read about whale fall, a phenomenon where when a whale dies far away from land, many organisms come along and feed off its body for years as it slowly sinks into the depths of the ocean. Chan expressed that although it is unfortunate that a whale dies in such a way, it is extraordinary it can still support other organisms in its habitat after death. Chan creates the imagery of using water as a coffin and converting one's body into dessert as an analogy for one's willingness to self-sacrifice if it means it will help others succeed.Coincidentally, Chan wrote the song by the ocean while he was filming We are the Littles.

Chan participated in writing the music for "蝸牛" (Snail), performed by his group member Anson Kong. In September 2020, the duo released their duet version with an accompanying music video.

On 18 November 2020, Chan released his second self-written song "背伴" (Betrayal). Chan combines the word betrayal with the homophonous first character of companion to portray a love story where one's companion secretly betrays them behind their back.

On 29 March 2021, Chan shifted away from his usual dark and serious music style with the release of his upbeat love song "DWBF".

The drama centres around three young adults struggling to figure out what they want in life in the face of uncertainty. The trio start up a small detective business to solve miscellaneous problems (as Chan's character says, they will do pretty much anything, as long as it does not break the law). The drama touches upon topics such as abandonment, grief, honesty, integrity, self-determination and choosing one's chosen family. It was during the drama production when Chan started dating his co-star Amy Lo, but the couple has since broken up as of November 2022.

In addition, his duet with Kong, "蝸牛" (Snail), was chosen as the 6th Top Song of the Year.

Chan's manager Wong expressed her desire for Chan to open up more. Chan expressed that he is quite introverted and felt that he did open up more and became more talkative since becoming a performer. At the same time, he felt he has also become more guarded about his inner thoughts.

Discography

Singles

As lead artist

Collaborations

Filmography

Television series

Variety show

Film

Achievements and nominations

References

External links 
 
 
 

1993 births
Living people
Alumni of the City University of Hong Kong
Hong Kong men's volleyball players
Hong Kong male taekwondo practitioners
Hong Kong male television actors
Cantopop singers
Hong Kong male singers
21st-century Hong Kong male actors
21st-century Hong Kong male singers
Hong_Kong_idols
Mirror (group) members
King Maker contestants
Cantopop singer-songwriters
Hong Kong male singer-songwriters